Cyathea corcovadensis is a species of tree fern native to Paraguay and Serra do Mar in southern Brazil, where it grows in primary and secondary forest, as well as scrub, at an altitude of 250–2100 m. The erect trunk is short, usually about 30–60 cm tall. Fronds are bipinnate and 2.5 m or more in length. The rachis ranges in colour from brown to purplish and is covered with warts and scattered brown scales. Sori occur either between the fertile pinnule midvein and the edge of the lamina or just beside the midvein. They lack indusia. C. corcovadensis is a variable species, especially in terms of pinnule shape and degree of dissection.

The specific epithet corcovadensis refers to Corcovado, the 704 m tall peak in central Rio de Janeiro.

References

Braggins, John E. & Large, Mark F. 2004. Tree Ferns. Timber Press, Inc., p. 116. 
The International Plant Names Index: Cyathea corcovadensis

corcovadensis
Flora of Brazil
Flora of Paraguay
Ferns of the Americas
Plants described in 1819